Now That's What I Call Music! 23 refers to at least two different Now That's What I Call Music! series albums.
 Now That's What I Call Music! 23 (UK series), released in November 1992
 Now That's What I Call Music! 23 (U.S. series), released on November 7, 2006